The Chiasso Open (currently sponsored as the Axion Open) is a tournament for professional female tennis players played on outdoor clay courts. The event is classified as a $60,000 ITF Women's World Tennis Tour tournament and has been held in Chiasso, Switzerland, since 2011.

Past finals

Singles

Doubles

External links
 ITF search
 

ITF Women's World Tennis Tour
Clay court tennis tournaments
Tennis tournaments in Switzerland
Recurring sporting events established in 2011